Dalhousie was a provincial electoral district in New Brunswick, Canada. It was created from the multi-member riding of Restigouche in the 1973 electoral redistribution, and abolished in the 1994 electoral redistribution.

Members of the Legislative Assembly

Election results

External links
Website of the Legislative Assembly of New Brunswick

Former provincial electoral districts of New Brunswick